Al Kawd is a town in south-western Yemen, near Zinjibar. It is located in the Abyan Governorate and lies on the Gulf of Aden, approximately 40 kilometres by road east of Aden. The Wadi Bana, a major river of Yemen flows into the sea to the east of the town.

History
On May 19-20 1994, during the 1994 civil war in Yemen, rebel planes dropped two bombs near the cemetery in al-Kawd, killing four boys.

2011 revolt and recapture

On November 15, fighters loyal to al-Qaeda in the Arabian Peninsula took over the town, a key for the Battle of Zinjibar. Yemeni troops recaptured the town on August 14, 2016.

Notes

External links
Towns and villages in the Abyan Governorate

Populated coastal places in Yemen
Populated places in Abyan Governorate
Villages in Yemen